The Cihanbeyli gudgeon (Gobio insuyanus) is a species of gudgeon, a small freshwater in the family Cyprinidae. It is endemic to the Insuyu stream in Turkey.

References

 

Gobio
Fish described in 1960